Thesium linophyllon is a species of flowering plant belonging to the family Santalaceae.

Its native range is France to Latvia and Central Greece.

Synonym:
 Linophyllum clusii Bubani
 Linosyris intermedia (Schrad.) Kuntze
 Linosyris linophyllon Kuntze
 Thesium arvense Horv.
 Thesium fulvopes Griess.
 Thesium hutterianum Opiz
 Thesium intermedium Schrad.
 Thesium linariae-folium Gilib.
 Thesium linifolium Christm.
 Thesium linifolium Schrank
 Thesium linophyllon var. pilosiusculum Lawalrée
 Thesium transsilvanicum Schur
 Xerololophus trinervis Dulac

References

Santalaceae